Goodenia nocoleche is a species of flowering plant in the family Goodeniaceae and is endemic to far western New South Wales. It is an ephemeral amphibious herb with floating, lance-shaped leaves and racemes of yellow flowers often tinged with pink.

Description
The leaves on the stems are similar but smaller. The seeds germinate in shallow temporary wetlands, with partial drying stimulating flowering.

Taxonomy and naming
Goodenia nocoleche was first formally described in 2005 by Belinda Pellow and John L.Porter in the journal Telopea from plants grown from seed collected by Porter from the Nocoleche Nature Reserve in 2000. The specific epithet (nocoleche) refers to the type location.

Distribution and habitat

References

nocoleche
Flora of New South Wales
Plants described in 2005
Endemic flora of Australia